Kastsyukovichy' District (Kostyukovichsky raion) is a raion (district) in Mogilev Region, Belarus, the administrative center is the town of Kastsyukovichy. As of 2009, its population was 26,410. Population of Kastsyukovichy accounts for 60.6% of the district's population.

Notable residents 

Masiej Siadnioŭ (1915 (1913?), Mokraje village - 2001), Belarusian poet and novelist, victim of the Gulag

References

 
Districts of Mogilev Region